TrSS St George was a passenger vessel built for the Great Western Railway in 1906.

History

She was built by Cammell Laird for the Great Western Railway as one of a trio of new ships which included TrSS St Patrick and TrSS St David. She was launched on 13 January 1906 by Mrs David MacIver, and later that year started work on the new Fishguard to Waterford service.

In May 1913 she was sold to the Canadian Pacific Railway. In 1917 she was requisitioned by the Canadian Government and acted as a hospital ship. In 1919 the Canadian Pacific Railway sold her to the Great Eastern Railway where she operated services to and from Harwich.

She was scrapped in October 1929 by Hughes-Bolckow Shipbreaking Company in Blyth.

References

1906 ships
Passenger ships of the United Kingdom
Steamships of the United Kingdom
Ships built on the River Tyne
Ships of the Great Western Railway
Ships of CP Ships
Ships of the Great Eastern Railway
Hospital ships of Canada